The Regions of Venezuela are two groupings of Venezuela's states, capital district, and federal dependencies. Venezuela's natural regions (Regiones naturales) are divided by natural geography, and administrative regions (Regiones político-administrativas) are delineated for the purpose of regional administration.

Administrative regions
Administrative regions (Regiones político-administrativas) are grouped from Venezuela's neighboring states, federal dependencies, and the capital district for the purpose of local administration in the process of regional development. The Political-Administrative regions were created from a decree on 11 June 1969 and have been modified since their creation, and there are currently nine regions.

Notes:

 Population figures are 2005 estimates
 The area of the Páez municipality has, for the time being, been incorrectly counted here as belonging to the Llanos Region, rather than the Andean Region.

Natural regions

Natural regions (Regiones naturales) are grouped based on a natural region, regardless of population or development, and formed from geo-physical criteria such as geological constitution, relief, climate, hydrography, vegetation, soils, and others. Venezuela is considered one of 18 Megadiverse countries by Conservation International, and the Natural regions do not always correspond exactly to the borders of the states.

Venezuela is divided into eight Natural regions:

Andean Natural Region
Caribbean Mountain-System Natural Region
Guayana Natural Region
Insular Natural Region
Lara-Falcón Hill-System Natural Region
Los Llanos Natural Region
Lake Maracaibo Lowlands Natural Region
Orinoco Delta Natural Region

References

 
Subdivisions of Venezuela